Flight 120 may refer to the following accidents involving commercial airliners:
 Central African Airways Flight 120, crashed on 17 March 1955
 Aeroflot Flight 120, crashed on 13 December 1959
 TAME Flight 120, crashed on 28 January 2002
 China Airlines Flight 120, caught fire and exploded after landing on 20 August 2007
 UTair Flight 120, crashed on 2 April 2012

0120